Roger Härtl is a board-certified neurological surgeon at Weill-Cornell Medical College and NewYork-Presbyterian Hospital.  He is Director of Spinal Surgery at the Weill Cornell Brain & Spine Center  in New York and the neurosurgeon for the New York Giants. Härtl has been named by Becker's Spine Review as one of the Top 50 Spine Surgeons in the United States as well as one of the Top 10 Spine and Neurosurgeon Leaders at Non-Profit Hospitals. He was named one of New York's Top Doctors by New York magazine after he saved the life of New York firefighter Eugene Stolowski, whose leap from a burning building left him critically injured.

Education 
Härtl received his M.D. from the Ludwig-Maximillians University in Munich, Germany. He completed post-doctoral fellowships at the Weill Cornell Medical College as well as the Charité Hospital of the Humboldt University in Berlin, Germany, followed by a surgical internship and residency at Allegheny General Hospital in Pittsburgh, Pennsylvania. He completed his neurosurgery residency at NewYork-Presbyterian/Weill Cornell Medical Center and Memorial Sloan-Kettering Cancer Center, after which he pursued specialized training in complex spine surgery at the Barrow's Neurological Institute in Phoenix under Volker Sonntag. He has worked with Weill Cornell Medical College's Department of Neurosurgery in New York since 2004.

Books 
 Biological Approaches to Spinal Disc Repair and Regeneration for Clinicians New York, New York : Thieme Publishers, 2017 
 ''Minimally Invasive Spine Surgery: Techniques, Evidence, and Controversies” Davos, Switzerland : AOSpine, 2012

Career 
Härtl's scientific work focuses on traumatic brain injury (TBI) and he has lectured and published on the surgical treatment of spine disorders, traumatic brain injury, and spinal cord injury. In conjunction with the Brain Trauma Foundation in New York, where he serves as a member of the Medical Advisory Board, Härtl helped develop the treatment guidelines for the medical and surgical management of head injury that are used nationwide.

Grants and awards 
In 2011 Härtl and his colleague at Cornell in Ithaca, Larry Bonassar, were awarded a $100,000 grant from the NFL to help develop a new generation of artificial discs for the spine. Härtl and Bonassar have also received $400,000 in funding from AOSpine and the AOFoundation.

Tanzania Neurosurgery Project 
Härtl and his team bring vital neurosurgical equipment to Bugando Medical Center and train local surgeons to perform basic neurosurgical procedures. His team performed the first spinal instrumentation procedures on Tanzanian patients with serious injuries to their spine. Not only did they perform the first complex occipito-cervical instrumentation procedure in this part of the world, but they we were also able to train two of the local surgeons, who, since then, have been able to perform more than 20 similar surgeries on patients in need. His team is  doing “hands-on” training of doctors in Tanzania, providing them with a high level of expertise in neurosurgical procedures. Providing the highest level of surgical training to these eager, talented surgeons impacts every other level of care—nursing, anesthesia, intensive care treatment, general ward care.  Setting the bar high encourages a positive response and team effort involving all areas Since 2015, Dr. Hartl has led an annual course in Tanzania training local providers to treat neurotrauma patients. After the course in 2018, Muhimbili Orthopaedic Institute  in Dar Es Salaam announced that the hospital was launching its neurosurgery program.

References 

Cornell University faculty
Living people
American neurosurgeons
Year of birth missing (living people)